Joshua Kenny is a British sport shooter who took bronze overall in the Standard division at the 2018 IPSC Shotgun World Shoot. Previously, at the 2015 IPSC Shotgun World Shoot he took the Standard division Junior category gold medal.

Other merits 
 UKPSA British Masters Champion 2015 and 2016.
 UK Junior Champion for consecutive years 2013, 2014 and 2015.
 British Open Champion 2015 and 2016.
 IPSC Central European Shotgun Open Champion 2016.

See also 
 Tim Yackley, American sport shooter
 Kim Leppänen, Finnish sport shooter

References

External links 
 Joshua Kenny Official Instagram Page

Year of birth missing (living people)
Living people
IPSC shooters
British male sport shooters
Place of birth missing (living people)